József Gulrich (22 May 1942 – 20 July 2000) was a Hungarian swimmer. He competed in two events at the 1964 Summer Olympics.

References

1942 births
2000 deaths
Hungarian male swimmers
Olympic swimmers of Hungary
Swimmers at the 1964 Summer Olympics
Swimmers from Budapest
20th-century Hungarian people